Antisemitism in Argentina is a significant issue for the Jewish community in the country as well as Argentina in general.

Background
Argentina is noted for its history of serving as a refuge for Nazis. It is believed by the United Nations that three organized neo-Nazi groups are currently active in Argentina, however, these groups are relatively uninfluential politically and include less than 300 members between the three groups. On the other hand, it is believed that most antisemitic activity in Argentina stems from anti-Israel movements of militant Islamists and radical leftists, rather than from neo-Nazis.

Argentina is home to well over 200,000 Jews, which is the largest population in South America. Most of the Jewish Argentines can trace their roots to Eastern Europe and the Middle East rather than Western Europe. They arrived mostly in the early 20th century fleeing political conflict in their homeland.

Indicators of antisemitism 
Journalists observing the number of spray-painted swastikas on the streets of Buenos Aires have voiced concern that antisemitism persists underneath Argentina's political correctness.

Government response 
In 2017, twenty five percent of discrimination complaints submitted to the Buenos Aires City Prosecutor's Office involved antisemitic activity. By the following year, seventy percent of all cases were closed due to lack of evidence, thirteen percent were subject to an lengthier investigation, eight percent were being processed in the courts and two percent of those accused of antisemitic acts were sentenced by the courts.

Community reporting 
Reporting on antisemitism is compiled in the Annual Anti-Semitism Report published by the Center for Social Studies (CES) of the Delegation of Argentine Israelites Associations (DAIA).

According to the 2017 CES report on antisemitism, close to ninety percent of the over 400 complaints it received that year related to online activities, especially on social media.

Notable incidents
In 2009, following public outcry concerning a prominent Catholic bishop who made statements denying the Holocaust, the Argentinian government expelled British-born bishop, Richard Williamson, though the official reason cited by immigration authorities was a visa technicality.

A notable incident in late 2018 involved a throng of soccer fans chanting an antisemitic slogan of "killing Jews to make soap," (referencing the actions of Nazi Germany producing soap made from human corpses). The fans went on to damage property and police were called to ensure the safety of the players and other spectators. The incident was sparked by the outcome of the soccer match in which one team with Jewish roots won the match. The incident was subsequently investigated by Argentinian police.

In March 1992 a group called the Islamic Jihad Organization carried out a suicide bombing attack on the building of the Israeli embassy in Buenos Aires, which killed 29 civilians. Among the dead there were two Israeli women who were the wives of the embassy's consul and first secretary. 

In July 1994 there was a suicide van bomb attack on the Asociación Mutual Israelita Argentina (AMIA; Argentine Israelite Mutual Association) building in Buenos Aires. The bombing killed 85 people and left hundreds injured. The Argentine government has accused Iran and Hezbollah of carrying out the attack. While the motives remain unclear, it was either a direct attack against Argentine Israelis or a response to Argentina not completing a nuclear deal with Tehran.

See also 

 1992 attack on Israeli embassy in Buenos Aires
 AMIA bombing

References

 
Jews and Judaism in Argentina
Argentina